Mike Salay (born Michael Szalai June 10, 1909; died November 19, 1973) was an American racecar driver from South Bend, Indiana. Salay made eight starts in AAA Championship Car in 1948 and 1949 including the 1948 Indianapolis 500.  He attempted to qualify again in 1949 but failed to do so. His best finish was sixth at Trenton Speedway in 1949. In 1950 he attempted the June Milwaukee Mile race and failed to qualify. He entered the 1951 Indianapolis 500 but wrecked his car in a practice crash.

Indy 500 results

References

Indianapolis 500 drivers
1909 births
1973 deaths
Sportspeople from South Bend, Indiana
Racing drivers from Indiana